Eucalyptus decolor is a species of small to medium-sized tree that is endemic to Queensland. It has rough, hard, fissured "ironbark", lance-shaped to curved adult leaves that are distinctly paler on the lower surface, flower buds in groups of seven, white flowers and hemispherical to cup-shaped fruit.

Description
It has hard, dark grey fissured "ironbak" on the trunk and larger branches, white to pinkish bark on the thinner branches. The flower buds are arranged on a branching inflorescence with the buds in groups of seven on each branch. Flowering occurs from December to March and the flowers are white.

Taxonomy and naming
Eucalyptus decolor was first formally described in 1989 by Anthony Bean and Ian Brooker from a specimen that Bean collected on Mount Castletower near Port Curtis. The description was published in the journal Austrobaileya. The specific epithet (decolor) is a Latin word meaning "discolored" or "faded", referring to the pale underside of the leaves.

Distribution and habitat
This eucalypt is only known from a few small populations, mostly in hilly and mountainous country in south-east Queensland.

Conservation status
Eucalyptus decolor is classed as "near threatened" under the Queensland Government Nature Conservation Act 1992. The main threats to the species are land clearing and inappropriate fire regimes.

See also
List of Eucalyptus species

References

Trees of Australia
decolor
Myrtales of Australia
Flora of Queensland
Taxa named by Ian Brooker
Plants described in 1989